Delta is a Dutch rugby union team from that competes annually in the Rugby Europe Super Cup Western Conference competition along with The Brussels Devils, Lusitanos XV and The Castilla y Leon Iberians.

Squad
A 36-man squad was announced in September 2021.

Coaches

Current coaching staff
The current coaching staff for the Delta team:

See also
 Netherlands national rugby union team
 Rugby union in the Netherlands
 Rugby Europe Super Cup

References

External links
Delta Rugby

Rugby clubs established in 2021
Sport in Amersfoort
Dutch rugby union teams
2021 establishments in the Netherlands
Rugby Europe Super Cup